Trolleybuses in Auckland were part of the Auckland public transport system from 1938 until 1980.

History
On 19 December 1938, a one kilometre trolleybus route opened to service the Farmers Trading Company department store (now the Heritage Hotel) in Hobson Street, travelling via Queen, Wyndham, Hobson and Victoria Streets. It was operated by the Auckland Transport Board with four Leyland TB trolleybuses. 

In September 1949, a second route was introduced to Herne Bay. Between 1951 and 1961, further routes were added with the last trams replaced in 1956. The Meadowbank route closed in 1968, with the network contracting throughout the 1970s, with the last route ceasing on 26 September 1980.

However the Auckland Regional Authority had placed an order for equipment to build a new system from Herne Bay to Newmarket prior to this. The proposal was abandoned in 1981 and the equipment, including 20 unused Volvo B10M bus chassis, was sold to Wellington.

Vehicles

References

Auckland
Public transport in Auckland
Trolleybus transport in New Zealand
1938 establishments in New Zealand
1980 disestablishments in New Zealand